The Pancasila Youth (PP) is an Indonesian far-right paramilitary organization established in 1959. The organisation's name refers to Pancasila, the official "five principles" of the Indonesian state. Pemuda Pancasila was involved in the  Indonesian mass killings of 1965–66, and supported the New Order regime of President Suharto. Its members extort money, control car parking and offer security services.

History
The organization officially dates its foundation as 28 October 1959 as the youth wing of the League of Supporters of Indonesian Independence party, which had been established by General Abdul Haris Nasution to promote the political interests of the Indonesian Army. This was shortly after President Sukarno's decree restoring the 1945 Constitution, which the military supported, and which the Pemuda Pancasila was to "back up". There is some ambiguity as to the actual founding date, and it is possible that 28 October was decided on retrospectively as it is the anniversary of the 1928 Youth Pledge. Spego Goni became the organization's chairman in 1961
In 1962, he proposed sending Pemuda Pancasila members to fight for "liberation" of Netherlands New Guinea in support of Indonesia's military campaign, Operation Trikora, supplying a fictitious list of names as evidence of the organization's readiness. Meanwhile, Pemuda Pancasila began expanding outside Jakarta. In Medan, Effendi Nasution, leader of a youth organization that made money from extortion and bodyguard services, became the local Pemuda Pancasila leader. It was in Medan that the organization took the dominant role in the killings of suspected communists after the 1965 coup attempt, as described in the 2012 documentary The Act of Killing. In Jakarta, the organization focused more on stealing property belonging to communist organizations and taking over and buildings, some of which were subsequently sold. 

Currently Yapto Soerjosoemarno is the leader of this organization, and was one of the semi-official political gangster (preman) groups that supported the New Order military dictatorship of Suharto. 

In The Act of Killing, it is stated that the organization currently has three million members. National membership estimates from the late 1990s ranged from four to ten million people.

In May 2020, the Bekasi chapter of the Pancasila Youth mailed out letters to prominent local businesspeople asking for Tunjangan Hari Raya in exchange for "peace and security". The Bekasi Police has demanded the chapter retract the letter.

Notable members
Ahmad Riza Patria
Anwar Congo
Bambang Soesatyo
La Nyalla Mattalitti
Tjahjo Kumolo
Yapto Soerjosoemarno
Zainudin Amali
Klemen Tinal

See also 
 Indonesian killings of 1965–66
 Pancasila (politics)
 Patriot Party (Indonesia)
 Red guards
 Colectivo (Venezuela)
 Argentine Anticommunist Alliance
 Tonton Macoute
 Ku Klux Klan
 Hitler Youth
 Zaitokukai

References

Further reading 
 

Pancasila (politics)
Indonesian anti-communists
Politics of Indonesia
Anti-communism in Indonesia
Organized crime in Indonesia
Anti-communist organizations
Paramilitary organizations based in Indonesia